Aafat is 1977 Indian Hindi-language crime thriller film directed by Atma Ram, starring Navin Nischol, Leena Chandavarkar, Amjad Khan, Mehmood and Nazir Hussain.

Plot
Inspector Amar and Inspector Chhaya are after the criminal Hardayal. Amar and Chhaya fall in love. Amar goes beyond the call of duty to catch Hardayal and hence becomes suspended. Amar is caught by Hardayal and is held captive. Now Chhaya is supposed find the criminal Hardayal.

Songs
The soundtrack was composed by Nitin Mangesh.
"Koi Kahe Mai Khanjar Hu" - Lata Mangeshkar
"Oye Laila Oye Laila Tere Pyar Me Majnu Rota Hai" - Kishore Kumar, Usha Mangeshkar
"Ye Nasha Jaan Meri Hai" - Lata Mangeshkar

Cast

Navin Nischol - Inspector Amar
Leena Chandavarkar - Inspector Chhaya
Jayshree T. - Rajni
Mehmood - Mahesh
Amjad Khan - Shera
Nazir Hussain - Dindayal
Kamal Kapoor - Police Commissioner
Prema Narayan - Champa
Faryal - Jenny
Keshto Mukherjee - Drunkard
Tiwari
Sajjan
Anil Chandavarkar (first film)

References

External links 
 

1977 films
1970s Hindi-language films
Films scored by Nitin Mangesh